James Francis O'Conner (November 28, 1861 – September 17, 1940) was a United States Navy sailor and a recipient of the United States military's highest decoration, the Medal of Honor.

Biography
Born on November 28, 1861, in Portsmouth, Virginia, O'Conner joined the Navy from that state. On that night, while Jean Sands was outside the Norfolk Naval Shipyard, he and another sailor, Landsman William Sweeney, jumped overboard and rescued a young girl from drowning. For this action, both O'Conner and Sweeney were awarded the Medal of Honor four years later, on October 18, 1884.

O'Conner's official Medal of Honor citation reads:
For jumping overboard from the U.S.S. Jean Sands, opposite the Norfolk Navy Yard, on the night of 15 June 1880, and rescuing from drowning a young girl who had fallen overboard.

O'Conner died on September 17, 1940, at age 78 and was buried at Oak Grove Cemetery in Portsmouth.

See also

List of Medal of Honor recipients in non-combat incidents

References

External links

1861 births
1940 deaths
People from Portsmouth, Virginia
United States Navy sailors
United States Navy Medal of Honor recipients
Non-combat recipients of the Medal of Honor